Spartak Galeyevich Akhmetov (born 8 June 1949) is a retired Russian politician who was a member of the 5th State Duma. Akhmetov served as the head of the administration of Sterlitamak from 1992 to 2007.

References 

Living people
1949 births
Mayors of places in Russia
Fifth convocation members of the State Duma (Russian Federation)
Communist Party of the Soviet Union members
United Russia politicians
21st-century Russian politicians